Stuart George Wilkinson from Ulverston is an English professional rugby league football coach and former player from Barrow in Cumbria.

Coaching career
He is the former Elite Coach Mentor for the French Rugby League and assistant coach for Widnes Vikings of the Co-operative Championship.

Wilkinson was previously assistant coach with Leeds Rhinos and Wigan Warriors but left the Super League team to join Widnes Vikings in 2008. Wilkinson was also assistant coach to the Leeds Rhinos side that won the World Club Championship in 2005.

International
He is also a double junior world champion as a Great Britain Academy Coach, beating Australia, New Zealand and France many times between 1998 and 2007. A full England Coach, British Lion assistant for the 2006 3 nations and Head Coach of the Wales National Team 2004.

Serbia
He is the head coach of the Serbia national team.

France
From 2008 to 2009 he worked for the French National side as an elite coach mentor helping France improve with the juniors beating Australia.

References

https://www.pontefractandcastlefordexpress.co.uk/sport/rugby-league/castleford-tigers/castleford-tigers-add-to-coaching-staff-1-6936187

1960 births
Living people
Barrow Raiders coaches
Barrow Raiders players
English rugby league coaches
English rugby league players
Rugby articles needing expert attention
Rugby league players from Manchester
Russia national rugby league team coaches
Serbia national rugby league team coaches
Wales national rugby league team coaches